Jade's Salon is Jade Goody's first ever reality show, depicting Jade's opening of her first business "Ugly's". It aired on Living television and was a hit for the channel.

Living re-ran the show all weekend following the death of Goody on 22 March 2009.

References

External links
 

2005 British television series debuts
2005 British television series endings
2000s British reality television series
Sky Living original programming
English-language television shows